HMS Rye was a member of the 1719 Establishment Group of 20-gun sixth rates. After commissioning she spent her career in Home waters on trade protection duties. She was broken up in 1735.

Rye was the second named vessel since it was used for a 32-gun fifth ratelaunched at Sheerness in 1696, rebuilt in 1717 as a 24-gun sixth rateused as a breakwater from 1727 and broken in December 1727.

Construction
She was ordered on 11 May 1727 from Chatham Dockyard to be built under the guidance of Benjamin Rosewell, Master Shipwright of Chatham. She was launched on 6 October 1727. She was completed on 7 February 1728 at a cost of 4,724.16.6d. She was surveyed on 13 November 1724.

Commissioned Service
She was commissioned in November 1727 under the command of Captain John Edwards, RN for service in Home Waters then on to Jamaica in 1731. With the death of Captain Edwards on 28 August 1731, Captain William Swale, RN took over becoming the Flagship of Rear-Admiral Charles Stewart. Her hull was sheathed with Doctor Hardisway's composition ('graved black') at Sheerness in November 1732.

Disposition
HMS Rye was broken up at Sheerness in December 1735.

Notes

Citations

References
 Winfield 2007, British Warships in the Age of Sail (1714 – 1792), by Rif Winfield, published by Seaforth Publishing, England © 2007, EPUB , Chapter 6, Sixth Rates, Sixth Rates of 20 or 24 guns, Vessels acquired from 1 August 1714, 1719 Establishment Group, Rye
 Colledge, Ships of the Royal Navy, by J.J. Colledge, revised and updated by Lt Cdr Ben Warlow and Steve Bush, published by Seaforth Publishing, Barnsley, Great Britain, © 2020, EPUB , (EPUB), Section R (Rye)

 

1720s ships
Corvettes of the Royal Navy
Ships built in Portsmouth
Naval ships of the United Kingdom